Mulberry School District was a school district headquartered in Mulberry, Arkansas.

On July 1, 2004, the district consolidated with the Pleasant View School District to form the Mulberry–Pleasant View Bi-County School District.

References

External links
 

Education in Franklin County, Arkansas
Defunct school districts in Arkansas
2004 disestablishments in Arkansas
School districts disestablished in 2004